Patrick Earl Houston (born February 8, 1973), better known by his stage name Project Pat, is an American rapper from Memphis, Tennessee. He is the older brother of Juicy J, the co-founder of Three 6 Mafia.

Houston was formerly a member of hip hop group the Kaze, joining the group in 1998 the same year that the album KamiKaze Timez Up was released.

Career

Music beginnings and Ghetty Green 
Project Pat began his career with appearances on his brother Juicy J's early releases with DJ Paul in the early 1990s. After serving several years in prison for robbery charges and disappearing from recording, he re-emerged in 1999 with the solo album Ghetty Green, released on his brother's Hypnotize Minds label. He became an affiliated member of Juicy and Paul's group Three 6 Mafia, and first gained mainstream attention when he provided the hook for the group's hit single "Sippin' on Some Syrup" in 2000.

2000–2002: Mista Don't Play: Everythangs Workin and Layin' Da Smack Down 
Houston released his second studio album Mista Don't Play: Everythangs Workin on February 13, 2001. The singles "Chickenhead" and "Don't Save Her" gained national radio airplay, along with music videos appearing on BET and MTV.

Shortly after the release of Mista Don't Play, Houston was charged with a parole violation and began a four-year prison sentence after unlicensed guns were discovered in his car during a traffic stop. His third album Layin' Da Smack Down was released in 2002 shortly after the beginning of the sentence and featured a video made for "Make Dat Azz Clap".

2002–2006: Release and Crook by da Book: The Fed Story 
After his release from prison in 2005 he released Crook by da Book: The Fed Story which came in on #64 on the Billboard 200, selling about 40,000 copies in its first week. The first single off the album was "Good Googly Moogly" featuring DJ Paul and Juicy J.

2007–2011: Walkin' Bank Roll, Real Recognize Real & Loud Pack 
After Houston was released from his deal with Columbia he signed with Koch, now known as E1. His 5th studio album Walkin' Bank Roll was released in 2007 and debuted at #45 on the Billboard 200. The lead single from the album was "Don't Call Me No Mo'" featuring Three 6 Mafia. His 6th studio album Real Recognize Real was his 1st major release for the label Asylum Records. The album featured the hit single "Keep It Hood" featuring OJ da Juiceman. It debuted at #8 on the Top Rap Albums Chart, with about 10,000 copies sold in the 1st week of release. On July 19, 2011, Houston released his 7th studio album Loud Pack on Hypnotize Minds & his newly founded label Project.

2012–present: Mixtapes and Mista Don't Play 2 
On March 28, 2013, Houston announced that his next album would be titled Mista Don't Play 2. The album will also be released by E1 Music, the first single will be "Be A G", and feature Juicy J, along with the late Doe B. Juicy J is also producing half of the album. The album was released April 14, 2015, on E1 Music.

On August 15, 2016, Houston appeared on the J. Sims song Visa, which appeared on the Mattrix Mixtape: We're Going Worldwide, Vol 5 compilation, presented by Matthew Rix. He announced a mixtape titled M.O.B. which was released on September 8, 2017.

In 2021, Project Pat was featured on the single "Knife Talk" on Drake's album Certified Lover Boy which reached position 4 of the Billboard Hot 100.

Personal life 
Project Pat was married to Alicia Evans-Houston on April 1, 2018.

Discography 

 Ghetty Green (1999)
 Murderers & Robbers (2000)
 Mista Don't Play: Everythangs Workin (2001)
 Layin' da Smack Down (2002)
 Crook by da Book: The Fed Story (2006)
 Walkin' Bank Roll (2007)
 Real Recognize Real (2009)
 Loud Pack (2011)
 Mista Don't Play 2: Everythangs Money (2015)
 M.O.B. (2017)

References

External links 
 
 
 Project Pat at Discogs
 Project Pat on Twitter

1973 births
Living people
African-American male rappers
Musicians from Memphis, Tennessee
Rappers from Memphis, Tennessee
21st-century American rappers
21st-century American male musicians
21st-century African-American musicians
20th-century African-American people